A lingua franca is a language used for communication between speakers of different languages. 

Lingua Franca or lingua franca may also refer to:

 Mediterranean Lingua Franca, the lingua franca of the Mediterranean Basin for which the term is originally named
 Lingua Franca (film), a 2019 film directed by Isabel Sandoval
 Lingua Franca (magazine), a former periodical about intellectual and literary life in academia
 "Linguafranc", a song by South Korean girl group Girls' Generation from the 2013 single Love & Girls

See also
 List of lingua francas